was the older Japanese photographer of that name.

Suzuki was born as the third son of a family named Takahashi) in Iwashina (now Matsuzaki, Shizuoka) in July 1835. Both his parents died when he was young, and in 1854 he moved into the Suzuki family (by the custom known as muko-iri []) in Shimoda when he married Suzuki Yoshichi's daughter, working in the family aramono business. The same year, a major tsunami (resulting from one of the Ansei great earthquakes) destroyed the building and ended the business.

At first working in sericulture, Suzuki often traveled to Yokohama, where he soon apprenticed at the Yokohama photographic studio of Shimooka Renjō in 1867. In 1872–1873 he was commissioned by J. R. Black, publisher of The Far East, to produce a photographic series documenting rural life. Images from this series continued to appear in Suzuki albums until the 1880s. In November 1873 Suzuki set up his own studio, producing portraits and souvenir albums. The same year, Okamoto Keizō , a successor of his at Shimooka's studio, married Suzuki's daughter, and Okamoto joined the Suzuki family (muko-iri again). Okamoto became Suzuki Shin'ichi II, and the older photographer thereupon changed his own name. About this time Suzuki may have studied photography under Yokoyama Matsusaburō. In 1884 he moved to a newly built, western-style two-storey studio. A branch studio was opened in Kudanzaka, Tokyo and operated by Suzuki II. Suzuki's photographs were highly acclaimed and he won an award for them in 1877, and in 1889 he and Maruki Riyō were commissioned to photograph Emperor Meiji and his wife. Purchasers of his works were mostly foreign residents and visitors, and in addition to sales from his own studio, Suzuki's photographs were distributed by Sargent, Farsari & Co. His studio was advertised as early as 1880, in Keeling's Guide to Japan, and subsequently in the Japan Directory until 1908, offering daguerreotypes, photographs (including large format hand-coloured albumen prints), and Suzuki's innovation of photographs printed on porcelain, the latter selling for 12 yen each. These advertisements indicate that from 1893 the Yokohama studio was run by I. S. Suzuki, that is, Suzuki's son Izaburō. Suzuki Shin'ichi retired in 1892 and he died in December 1918 at the age of 83.

Notes

References
 Bennett, Terry. Old Japanese Photographs: Collector's Data Guide London: Quaritch, 2006.  (hard)
 Bennett, Terry. Photography in Japan: 1853–1912 Rutland, Vermont: Charles E. Tuttle, 2006.  (hard)
 Nihon no shashinka / Biographic Dictionary of Japanese Photography. Tokyo: Nichigai Associates, 2005. . Pp. 223–4. Despite the English-language alternative title, all in Japanese.
 Kaneko Ryūichi. "Suzuki Shin'ichi". Nihon shashinka jiten / 328 Outstanding Japanese Photographers. Kyoto: Tankōsha, 2000. . P.186. Despite the English-language alternative title, all in Japanese.
 Yokoe, Fuminori. 'Part 3-3. Yokoyama Matsusaburo (1838-1884).' In The Advent of Photography in Japan/Shashin torai no koro, Tokyo Metropolitan Museum of Photography, and Hakodate Museum of Art, Hokkaido, eds. (Tokyo: Tokyo Metropolitan Foundation for History and Culture; Tokyo Metropolitan Museum of Photography; Hokkaido: Hakodate Museum of Art, 1997).

External links
 Suzuki within the Matsuzaki town site

Japanese photographers
1835 births
1918 deaths